The 2020 Las Vegas Lights FC season is the club's third season, and their third season in the United Soccer League Championship (USL-C), the second division of American soccer. This article covers the period from November 18, 2019, the day after the 2019 USL-C Playoff Final, to the conclusion of the 2020 USL-C Playoff Final, scheduled for November 12–16, 2020.

Current squad

Competitions

Exhibitions

USL Championship

Standings — Group B

Match results
On December 20, 2019, the USL announced the 2020 season schedule, creating the following fixture list for the early part of Las Vegas' season.

In the preparations for the resumption of league play following the shutdown prompted by the COVID-19 pandemic, the remainder of Las Vegas' schedule was announced on July 2.

U.S. Open Cup 

As a USL Championship club, Las Vegas will enter the competition in the Second Round, to be played April 7–9.

Season Overview
The Las Vegas Lights played their first match of the USL Season against USL expansion side San Diego Loyal, who were making their USL debut. The Las Vegas Lights opened the scoring when Junior Burgos scored a fantastic 40-yard effort in off the crossbar, the USL Goal of the Week and a possible USL Goal of the Year contender. San Diego Loyal soon equalized in the 15th minute when a Charles Adams shot took a deflection of a Las Vegas defender and went in past Delgado.
 
After the season was delayed by the COVID-19 pandemic, the Lights had poor losing performances in a 2–1 loss to San Diego Loyal and 1–0 loss to in-state rivals Reno 1868 FC. Because of positive COVID-19 cases, matches against San Diego Loyal and Tacoma Defiance were delayed. The club lost 1-0 again to Orange County SC, with both goalies making important saves. Las Vegas finally won their first match of the season against Tacoma Defiance, 3–1. Burgos opened the scoring through a far shot that deflected of Taylor Mueller in the 19th minute. The Lights then doubled their lead after a center by Yamikani Chester was tapped in by Rashawn Dally. Later in the match, Junior Sandoval scored after being assisted by Blake Frischknecht. In the 84th minute, Azriel Gonzalez got a goal back that squeezed through Lights keeper Thomas Olsen.

The club continued their run of form with a 3–3 draw against first place in Group B Phoenix Rising FC. Phoenix scored early through a shot by Rufat Dadashov, assisted by Solomon Asante.  Lights keeper Edward Delgado made several decisive saves against Junior Flemmings, but Flemmings scored in the 68th minute from a lob. The Las Vegas Lights got a goal back from Chester,  and soon after Junior Burgos hit the crossbar from a free kick. In the 90th minute Solomon Asante converted a penalty. The Las Vegas Lights then scored in stoppage time as a header by Chester hit of A. J. Cochran for an own goal. The club then equalized after a deflected free kick came to Ramon Martin Del Campo.

After the Phoenix draw, Vegas went down 1–0 to Orange County after a penalty converted by Aodhan Quinn. Las Vegas soon equalized after Del Campo scored from a corner. Substitute Frischknecht then scored a low shot assisted by Dally, before Junior Sandoval added gloss to the win in stoppage-time, making it 3–1. The Las Vegas Lights then lost a closely contested 4-3 thriller against LA Galaxy II, with lights player Raul Mendiola hitting the post in stoppage time. After a 1–1 draw with San Diego loyal (in which Blake Frischknecht scored his 4th goal or assist in 3 games) the club lost 2–0 to Phoenix Rising at home. In the away match, they lost 5–1, their worst result of their season to date. The Lights then lost a 2-goal lead against LA Galaxy II and ended up losing 3–2, with Augustine Williams netting a late penalty.

Las Vegas were eliminated from the play-offs after a 1–0 loss to Orange County SC, in which Mobi Fehr and Seth Moses being sent off. After San Diego Loyal beat Phoenix Rising 3–2, the lights could not finish above fifth. Vegas then had a 2–2 draw with La Galaxy II. Sandoval scored after collecting a long ball from Jordan Murrell. LA Galaxy turned the game around with two quick goals in the 71st and 81st minute. In stoppage-time, Dally equalized after some good dribbling by José Carrera García. Las Vegas then played rivals Reno 1868. The lights took the lead early through Junior Burgos but soon Reno equalized from Foster Langsdorf. The lights scored again from Yamikani Chester but Reno equalized soon after again from Kevin Partida. The score finished 2-2 and Reno won the Silver State Cup. The lights lost the final match of the season 4–2 to Orange County. Fans were permitted for the match, at limited capacity.

References

Las Vegas Lights FC
Las Vegas Lights FC
Las Vegas Lights FC seasons
Las Vegas Lights FC